Dormagen (Ripuarian: Dormaje) is a town in North Rhine-Westphalia, Germany in the Rhein-Kreis Neuss.

Geography
Dormagen is situated between Düsseldorf – Cologne – Mönchengladbach on the western bank of the river Rhine.

Division of the town
Dormagen consists of 16 subdivisions (with population figure):
 Broich: see Gohr
 Delhoven: 3,690
 Delrath: 3,082
 Dormagen Mitte: 5,621
 Gohr: 2,217 (with Broich)
 Hackenbroich (with Hackhausen): 8,689
 Hackhausen see Hackenbroich
 Horrem: 6,022
 Knechtsteden:
 Nievenheim (with Ückerath): 9,553
 Dormagen Nord: 3,514
 Rheinfeld: 5,403 (with Piwipp)
 St. Peter: see Stürzelberg
 Straberg: 2,840
 Stürzelberg: 4,643 (with St. Peter)
 Zons: 5,414 (with Nachtigall)
 Piwipp: 37 (Wohnmobil Parkplatz)

History
Dormagen was founded 50 AD. Its name was Durnomagus.

Economy
Its main industry and employer is the chemical factory of Bayer AG and since its founding the Covestro AG.

Transport
The town has three stations (Dormagen, Nievenheim and Dormagen Chempark) on the Lower Left Rhine Railway, linking Cologne and Krefeld.

The German motorway 57 connects Dormagen with the same cities.

Population

¹ City of Dormagen

Twin towns – sister cities

Dormagen is twinned with:
 Kiryat Ono, Israel
 Saint-André-lez-Lille, France
 Toro, Spain

Notable people
 Kai Wolters, actor
 Lothar Hensel (born 1961), bandoneon player
 Tim Rubink (born 1988), footballer

References

External links
  

Towns in North Rhine-Westphalia
Populated places on the Rhine
Rhein-Kreis Neuss
Districts of the Rhine Province